The Abu Salim Martyrs Brigade was an Islamist militia that advocated for the implementation of Sharia law within Derna, Libya. The group was known for enforcing strict social rules in the city.

Background
The Abu Salim Martyrs Brigade was created by former Libyan Islamic Fighting Group member Abdel-Hakim al-Hasidi. Following the Libyan Civil War, the brigade was taken over by Salim Derby. 

In 2014, the Islamic State of Iraq and the Levant (ISIL) in Libya took over much of Derna. Abu Salim and ISIL repeatedly clashed in the following months in disputes over power and resources. Derby was killed in fighting with ISIL militants in June 2015.

In november 17, 2015 44 civilians were kidnapped from an unknown number of road blocks in Tripoli. The civilians were released in two groups of 27 a few hours apart from each other, the authorities attributed the abduction to the Abu Salim Martyrs Brigade.

References

Islamism in Libya
Jihadist groups in Libya
Derna, Libya